Final Wonderland is a greatest hits album by Taiwanese singer Jolin Tsai. It was released on September 19, 2007, by Sony BMG. It contains 40 songs and 22 music videos previously released by Sony, and two remixed medleys.

Background and release 
On July 23, 2002, Tsai signed a recording contract with Sony, through which she later released three studio albums—Magic (2003), Castle (2004), and J-Game (2005), the three albums have sold more than 1.5 million, 1.5 million, and 1.2 million copies in Asia, respectively. In Taiwan, the three albums have sold more than 360,000, 300,000, and 260,000 copies, respectively, and each of them became the highest-selling album by a female artist and the second highest-selling album overall in their respective years of release. On February 16, 2006, Tsai signed a recording contract with EMI. On May 5, 2006, Sony BMG released for Tsai the greatest hits album, J-Top. On November 3, 2006, Sony BMG released for Tsai the compilation album, Favorite.

On September 19, 2007, Sony BMG released for Tsai the greatest hits album, Final Wonderland, which contains her 40 songs and 22 music videos previously released by Sony, and 2 newly remixed medleys. In its first week of release, it reached number 18 and number 19 on the weekly album sales charts of G-Music and Five Music.

Critical reception 
Tencent Entertainment's Shuwa commented: "This greatest hits album, which came out two days before the release of Agent J, and it is the third time Jolin's new and old labels have clashed. It is not just a collection of old hits, but almost all of the music works released by Sony, so it seems that this greatest hits album is more like a big compilation, and the most surprising is that three CDs and one music video DVD are only sold for one record's price. Unfortunately, the frequent release of old works made  music fans lose freshness, so this greatest hits album was not as popular as J-Top, and ultimately just a flash in the pan."

Sina Music's Stephen Lee commented: "To be fair, Final Wonderland is either very attractive or not very attractive. Why? Because Sony BMG had already released J-Top, a collection of her old songs, to compete Jolin's Dancing Diva in the last year. What's so appealing about this new greatest hits album if another one was released last year and the tracks are basically the same? However, if you didn't buy last year's J-Top or Jolin's old albums released in the past by Sony, this Final Wonderland should be your good choice, after all, the album includes Jolin's 40–50 old songs and music videos, it can be said to be "great value for money". In addition, some of Jolin's recent hits such as "Magic", "36 Tricks of Love", "J-Game", "Say Love you" and "Pirates" are all included in this album, if you want to look back on the diva's journey of Jolin, this album can be used for you."

Track listing

Release history

References

External links 
 

2007 greatest hits albums
Jolin Tsai compilation albums
Sony Music Taiwan compilation albums